Barry Dufour is a British academic and author who specializes in the area of education research. He is a visiting professor at De Montfort University, Leicester. In 1973, he co-authored with D. Lawton The New Social Studies in which they outlined their concerns that curricula be developed with age-appropriate schemes. He was the editor of the 1990 book  The New Social Curriculum: A Guide to Cross-Curricular Issues which also focused on issues of curricula.

In addition to his work in the field of education, in 1977 he wrote The World of Pop and Rock, called by Music in Education, at the time, "probably the best book yet on the pop industry written for teenagers".
He is the brother of former Libertines drummer Paul Dufour.

Principal books 
 Lawton, D. and Dufour, B. The New Social Studies, London: Heinemann Educational Books, 1973 (first edition) and 1976 (second edition)
 Dufour, B., The World of Pop and Rock, London: Macdonald, 1977
 Dufour, B., (ed), New Movements in the Social Sciences and Humanities, London: Temple Smith/Gower, 1982
 Dufour, B., (ed), The New Social Curriculum: A Guide to Cross-Curricular Issues, Cambridge: Cambridge University Press, 1990
 Breslin, T. and Dufour, B., (eds) Developing Citizens: A Comprehensive Introduction to Effective Citizenship Education in the Secondary School, London: Hodder Murray, 2006
 Dufour, B. and Curtis, W., Studying Education: an Introduction to the Key Disciplines in Education Studies, Maidenhead: Open University Press, 2011
 Dufour, B., Disruptive Behaviour in Schools: A Critical Introduction, London: Bloomsbury, forthcoming 2016/2017

References

External links
 De Montfort University profile

British educational theorists
1942 births
Living people
Writers from London
Alumni of the University of Birmingham